Hurricane Gert was a strong tropical cyclone that brought heavy surf and rip currents to the East Coast of the United States in August 2017. Gert originated from a tropical wave that moved off the coast of Africa on August 3 yet failed to organize significantly until August 12, when the system coalesced into a tropical depression east of the Bahamas. A few hours later, the depression became the seventh tropical storm of the annual hurricane season and was named Gert. For the next day, though, further intensification was hindered by the proximity of dry air. Once Gert was able to overcome that on August 14, however, Gert resumed strengthening while moving northwards, paralleling the United States coastline. Gert reached its peak intensity on August 16 at Category 2 status on the Saffir–Simpson scale as it accelerated northeastwards. Thereafter, increasing vertical wind shear and decreasing sea surface temperatures caused Gert to rapidly weaken and transition into an extratropical cyclone on August 17, well east of Atlantic Canada. The remnants of Gert dissipated late on August 18, after they merged with another extratropical cyclone over the open Atlantic.

During its lifetime, Gert brought heavy swells, rough surf, and rip currents to the East Coast of the United States and Atlantic Canada. Two fatalities occurred when two swimmers drowned amid heavy surf. The extratropical system that merged with the remnants of Gert went on to bring strong winds and rain to Ireland and parts of the United Kingdom.

Meteorological history

On August 2, the National Hurricane Center (NHC) began to track a tropical wave over western Africa. The wave emerged over the Atlantic Ocean on August 3, accompanied by a weak surface low-pressure area. While moving quickly westwards south of Cape Verde in a generally favorable environment characterized by high sea surface temperatures (SSTs) and low vertical wind shear, the wave showed some signs of development, and was given a high chance of consolidating into a tropical depression during the next five days by the NHC. However, by August 5, the system's swift movement brought it into less favorable conditions, causing most of the wave's associated showers and thunderstorms to dissipate. The wave continued to track westwards over the next few days, eventually splitting into two systems—the northern one being the precursor to Gert, and the southern portion later spawning Hurricane Kenneth in the Eastern Pacific.

Afterwards, the precursor to Gert moved west-northwestwards, passing north of Puerto Rico on August 11. As it did so, convective bands associated with the system began to curve and concentrate towards the center of the system, evidencing increasing organization. Although conditions generally favored further intensification, with high SSTs and low wind shear, mid-level dry air disrupted Gert's central convection, causing Gert's intensity to hold steady for the next 18 hours. However, by August 14, Gert's circulation had mixed out the dry air, poising the storm for further strengthening. At that time, Gert was moving north-northwestwards to northwards through a gap in the subtropical ridge.

From August 14 onwards, Gert strengthened markedly, developing persistent deep convection and a central dense overcast. Racing off to the east-northeast, Gert soon passed beyond the northern wall of the Gulf Stream, marking a significant decrease in SSTs. Compounded by increasing vertical wind shear and drier air, Gert began to weaken and its cloud pattern rapidly deteriorated; the system degraded to a tropical storm by 12:00 UTC on August 17. The weakening cyclone continued northeast over the open Atlantic Ocean, before dissipating by 00:00 UTC on August 19. The remnant energy and moisture of the system merged with another extratropical cyclone to the northwest, which later went on to affect Ireland and the United Kingdom.

Preparations and impact
While Gert did not approach any land areas during its lifetime as a tropical cyclone, Gert still generated heavy swells, rough surf, and rip currents along the East Coast of the United States and Atlantic Canada. At Nantucket, Massachusetts, several beaches were closed, and lifeguards conducted more than 25 water rescues on August 16 alone. Despite this, a 40-year-old man drowned off Nobadeer Beach around noon on August 16; attempts to revive him after he was pulled from the water with CPR were not successful. In the Outer Banks off Cape Hatteras National Seashore, a 63-year-old man drowned on August 14 after being caught in a rip current during an attempt to rescue another swimmer "in distress". The other swimmer later returned safely to shore.

The remnants of Gert merged with another extratropical cyclone that produced strong winds and heavy rain in Ireland and the United Kingdom. Ahead of the storm, Met Éireann issued yellow weather warnings for the entirety of Ireland, expecting heavy showers and localized flooding. As the storm hit, severe floods occurred in Northern Ireland, with floodwaters reaching . More than 100 people were rescued after being trapped in their cars or houses overnight.

See also

 Other tropical cyclones named Gert
Weather of 2017
Tropical cyclones in 2017
 Hurricane Alex (2004) – Category 3 hurricane that took a similar path.
 Hurricane Danielle (2010) – also caused large swells along the East Coast of the United States.
 Hurricane Chris (2018) – Hurricane of similar intensity that caused enhanced surf and swells along the United States East Coast.

References

External links

The National Hurricane Center's advisory archive on Hurricane Gert
Gert (Atlantic Ocean) from the National Aeronautics and Space Administration

Category 2 Atlantic hurricanes
Hurricanes in Massachusetts
Hurricanes in North Carolina